George Yod Phimphisan  (January 19, 1933 – December 19,  2017) was a 20th and 21st century bishop of the Catholic Church in Thailand.  He served as the second bishop of the Diocese of Udon Thani in the region of Isan, Thailand from 1975–2009.

Biography
Phimphisan was born in Bangkok.  He professed religious vows as a Redemptorist and studied for the priesthood at Immaculate Conception Seminary in Oconomowoc, Wisconsin, USA.   He was ordained a priest on June 24, 1958.

Father Phimphisan served as a priest in the Vice Province of Bangkok until October 2, 1975 when Pope Paul VI named him to be the second bishop of the Diocese of Udon Thani.  He was ordained a bishop by his predecessor, Bishop Clarence James Duhart, C.Ss.R., at the Cathedral of  Our Mother of Perpetual Help on December 12, 1975.  The principal co-consecrators were Archbishop Michel Kien Samophithak of Thare and Nonseng and Giovanni Morettiet  the Apostolic Pro-Nuncio to Thailand, and the Apostolic Delegate to Laos, Malaysia and Singapore.

Bishop Phimphisan served as the Apostolic Administrator of the Archdiocese of Thare and Nonseng from May 14, 2004 to July 1, 2005. He was the president of the Bishops’ Conference of Thailand for three terms: 1991–1994, 1997–2000 and 2006–2009.    He served the Diocese of Udon Thani for 34 years as its bishop before his resignation was accepted by Pope Benedict XVI on November 14, 2009.

The Bishop died on December 15, 2017 around 14:10 at Aek Udon Hospital.

References

External links

1933 births
2017 deaths
George Yod Phimphisan
George Yod Phimphisan
Redemptorist bishops
20th-century Roman Catholic bishops in Thailand
21st-century Roman Catholic bishops in Thailand